Norman DeMille Ross (May 2, 1895 – June 19, 1953) was an American competition swimmer who won five events at the Inter-Allied Games in June 1919, held at Joinville-Le-Pont near Paris, and three gold medals at the 1920 Summer Olympics in Antwerp, Belgium.  He set thirteen world records and won eighteen U.S. national championships during his career.

In later years he was a popular Chicago radio personality known to listeners as "Uncle Normie." His son, Norman A Ross Jr. (1922–2008), was a well-known radio and television host, corporate executive and civic leader in Chicago.

See also
 List of members of the International Swimming Hall of Fame
 List of multiple Olympic gold medalists
 List of Olympic medalists in swimming (men)
 World record progression 200 metres freestyle
 World record progression 400 metres freestyle
 World record progression 800 metres freestyle
 World record progression 4 × 200 metres freestyle relay
 Mutiny of the Matoika

References

External links

 
 

1890s births
1953 deaths
American male freestyle swimmers
World record setters in swimming
Northwestern University Pritzker School of Law alumni
Olympic gold medalists for the United States in swimming
Sportspeople from Portland, Oregon
Stanford Cardinal men's swimmers
Swimmers at the 1920 Summer Olympics
Medalists at the 1920 Summer Olympics
Swimmers from Portland, Oregon
Water polo players at the 1920 Summer Olympics